System Center Mobile Device Manager is a Mobile device management (MDM) solution providing over-the-air (OTA) management of Windows Mobile Smartphone security, applications and settings. System Center Mobile Device Manager supports devices running the Windows Mobile 6.1 and above operating system. Earlier, functions of this product provided by System Center Configuration Manager.

Important: Mainstream support for System Center Mobile Device Manager 2008 ended on July 9, 2013, and extended support ended on July 10, 2018.

Features 

Through ActiveDirectory-based policies, the product provides the following functions:
 Provisioning of device settings: provisioning the managed devices with settings, such as E-mail accounts and access points.
 Settings monitoring: setting and verifying the settings of managed devices, gathering diagnostics information and application inventory.
 Device security: back up, restore, lock, wipe and set up functionality restrictions for managed devices.
 Asset and application management: install/remove, update, gather inventory, version check and the starting or stopping of mobile applications, such as virus protection, encryption and mobile email clients.

Client 
System Center Mobile Device Manager client is located in ROM. All device management activities are centrally managed from the server side.

Server 
System Center Mobile Device Manager server components are deployed on multiple server computers, including a Mobile VPN server, a Windows Update server, and an ActiveDirectory domain controller.

References

External links
 Solution guide: Manage mobile devices and PCs by migrating to Configuration Manager with Windows Intune
 Solution guide: Mobile device management for Configuration Manager 2007 customers planning to migrate to System Center 2012 R2 Configuration Manager
 Windows Intune TechNet Library
 System Center Configuration Manager TechNet Library

Mobile software
Windows Mobile